The Secret of Brinkenhof is a 1923 German silent drama film directed by Svend Gade and starring Henny Porten, Paul Henckels and Rudolf Biebrach.

The art director Heinrich Beisenherz worked with Gade on the film's sets.

Cast
 Henny Porten as Maria Brinkenhof
 Paul Henckels as Jasper Brinkenhof
 Paul Manning as Anton Brinkenhof
 Alexander Wiruboff as Kardel-Fin
 Rudolf Biebrach as Jans Stedink, Schmied
 Alf Blütecher as Heinrich Örn, Schmiedegeselle
 Gertrud Eysoldt as Jungfer Eli
 Robert Leffler as Lars, Großknecht

References

Bibliography
 Grange, William. Cultural Chronicle of the Weimar Republic. Scarecrow Press, 2008.

External links

1923 films
Films of the Weimar Republic
German silent feature films
Films directed by Svend Gade
German black-and-white films
1923 drama films
German drama films
Films based on German novels
Silent drama films
1920s German films
1920s German-language films